The 1954 Australian federal election were held in Australia on 29 May 1954. All 121 seats in the House of Representatives were up for election, but no Senate election took place. The incumbent Liberal–Country coalition led by Prime Minister Robert Menzies defeated the opposition Labor Party led by H. V. Evatt, despite losing the two-party preferred vote. Although the ALP won the two-party preferred vote, six Coalition seats were uncontested compared to one ALP seat. The Psephos blog makes clear that if all seats had been contested, the Coalition would have recorded a higher primary vote than the ALP and possibly also a higher two-party preferred vote.

This was the first federal election that future Prime Minister Gough Whitlam contested as a member of parliament, having entered parliament at the 1952 Werriwa by-election.

Though they did not win government, this election was the last time that the Labor party would achieve more than 50% of the primary vote. the only other time this happened was in 1914.

Issues
The election was complicated by the Petrov Affair, in which Vladimir Petrov, an attache to the Soviet embassy in Canberra, defected amidst a storm of publicity, claiming that there were Soviet spy rings within Australia. Given that the 1951 election had been fought over the issue of banning the Communist Party of Australia altogether, it is unsurprising that such a claim would gain credibility.

Results

Notes
 Seven members were elected unopposed – three Liberal, three Country, and one Labor.
 See 1953 Australian Senate election for Senate composition.

Seats changing hands

Aftermath
The 20th session of the Parliament of the Commonwealth of Australia was officially opened by Her Majesty Queen Elizabeth II, Queen of Australia. This was the first time a reigning monarch had opened a session of parliament in Australia. The Queen wore her Coronation Dress to open the 20th session of parliament. The success of the 1954 Royal Tour of Australia (the first by a reigning sovereign), the recovery of the economy from a brief recession in 1951-52 and the Petrov Affair were all credited with assisting in the return of the government.

See also
 Candidates of the Australian federal election, 1954
 Members of the Australian House of Representatives, 1954–1955

References

University of WA  election results in Australia since 1890
AEC 2PP vote
Prior to 1984 the AEC did not undertake a full distribution of preferences for statistical purposes. The stored ballot papers for the 1983 election were put through this process prior to their destruction. Therefore, the figures from 1983 onwards show the actual result based on full distribution of preferences.

Federal elections in Australia
1954 elections in Australia
May 1954 events in Australia